Moshe Zimmermann (born 25 December 1943) is an Israeli historian and writer. Since 1986 he has been director of the Richard Koebner Minerva Center for German History at the Hebrew University of Jerusalem.

Biography
Moshe Zimmerman was born in Jerusalem.

Academic career 
Zimmermann received his undergraduate, graduate and doctorate in history at the Hebrew University of Jerusalem where he also currently works. His academic research focuses on the social history of Germany in the 18th and 20th centuries, as well as the history of German Jews and antisemitism.

In 2015 he was interviewed and filmed for the documentary The Essential Link: The Story of Wilfrid Israel by Yonatan Nir, in which he offered more angles to explain why Wilfrid Israel's story did not receive the expected public attention.

Lawsuit
In 2002, Zimmermann sued Haaretz for an unflattering mention in an article authored by a former student. In 2004, the lawsuit was, however, dismissed, with Zimmermann having been admonished by the judge.

Awards and recognition 
He was honoured with the Humboldt Prize in 1993, and the Jacob and Wilhelm Grimm Prize from the German Academic Exchange Service in 1997. He received Dr. Leopold Lucas Prize from the University of Tübingen in 2002, and was awarded the 2006 Theodor Lessing Prize for Criticism.

Published works  
  German Past – Israeli Memory. Tel Aviv 2002.
  Wilhelm Marr – The Patriarch of Antisemitism, New York, Oxford UP, 1986.
 Wilhelm Marr – The Patriarch of Antisemitism, Jerusalem, Shazar, 1982. (Hebr.)
  Deutsch-jüdische Vergangenheit: Der Judenhass als Herausforderung. Paderborn 2005.
  Goliaths Falle. Israelis und Palästinenser im Würgegriff 2004
  Wende in Israel. Zwischen Nation und Religion. 1996, 
  Die deutschen Juden 1914–1945. 1997, 
  Hamburgischer Patriotismus und deutscher Nationalismus. Die Emanzipation der Juden in Hamburg 1830–1865, Hamburg, Hans Christians, 1979.
  Deutsche gegen Deutsche. Das Schicksal der Juden 1938–1945. Berlin 2008.
  Die Angst vor dem Frieden. Das israelische Dilemma. Berlin 2010.

References

External links 

 Zimmerman's page of the homepage of the Hebrew University

1943 births
Israeli historians
Living people
Historians of Jews and Judaism
Israeli people of German-Jewish descent
Hebrew University of Jerusalem alumni
Academic staff of the Hebrew University of Jerusalem